Floor van den Brandt (born 23 November 1990) is a Dutch speed skater who is specialized in the sprint distances.

Career 
Van den Brandt finished fourth at the ISU World Cup 500m event in Seoul in November 2014. She is a member of Team AfterPay.

Personal records

References

External links
 
 Team Afterpay profile
 

1990 births
Dutch female speed skaters
Sportspeople from 's-Hertogenbosch
Living people
21st-century Dutch women